Radin Mas is a neighbourhood within Telok Blangah Estate, located in Bukit Merah, Singapore.

Etymology
The area was named after Radin Mas Ayu (Jawi: رادين مس ايو), a princess of the Javanese Royal Court. Her name literally translates to Princess of Golden Beauty.

History
Kampong Radin Mas was a small Malay village situated on the foothills of Mount Faber in Telok Blangah.

According to legend, Puteri Radin Mas Ayu was a young and very beautiful princess. After her mother died in a fire which was planned by some enemies intended to kill both her and her daughter, she fled from Java for Singapore together with her father, the crown prince, to avoid persecution at the hands of her uncle, the sultan. The area that was named after her was where her home was located when she first landed in Singapore.

She was buried near her first home at Telok Blangah. The tomb and a shrine, locally known as Makam Puteri Radin Mas, still stands today at Mount Faber Road, near the junction with Telok Blangah Road. There was an old village mosque nearby that also bore her name. It was, however, removed in 2001 to extend the road going up to Mount Faber.

Radin Mas came to be of prominence during 2007's National Day Rally when Prime Minister Lee Hsien Loong called it as the model of Singapore by 2020 when the proportion of Singaporeans above 65 years of age is expected to be 1 in 6.

Present
Today, while no street bears the name, the area is frequently referred to as Radin Mas. A road flyover http://www.streetdirectory.com/sg/radin-mas/15121_1.html , few buildings are also named after her, like Radin Mas Primary School and Radin Mas Community Club. Radin Mas SMC is also named in her honour, as a ward from 1976 to 1988 and since 2011.

There is also a Tahfiz school named Sekolah Ugama Radin Mas named after her at Masjid Darul Amaan in Eunos. The school has been in operation since 1956.

External links
 Reference from National Library of Singapore Infopedia Website
 Radin Mas Primary School
 GoogleMaps StreetView of Makam Puteri Radin Mas Ayu

Places in Singapore
Bukit Merah